The Massage Parlours Act was an Act of Parliament in New Zealand regulating massage parlours.

It was repealed by the Prostitution Reform Act 2003.

See also
Prostitution in New Zealand

References

External links
Text of the Act

Erotic massage
Prostitution law in New Zealand
1978 in New Zealand law
Repealed New Zealand legislation